

Highest-grossing films

List of films
A list of films released in Japan in 1997 (see 1997 in film).

See also
1997 in Japan
1997 in Japanese television

Footnotes

References

External links
 Japanese films of 1997 at the Internet Movie Database

1997
Japanese
Films